Liggett Lake Dam is a dam located in Allen Township, Union County, Ohio, United States, about  north of North Lewisburg, at .  It was built privately by L. Liggett in 1968 on a small tributary to the Big Darby Creek, and the reservoir created is called Liggett Lake.

References

Dams completed in 1968
Dams in Ohio